Anica Mrose Rissi is an American author of children's books and young adult novels. Her first book, Anna, Banana, and the Friendship Split, was published by Simon & Schuster in 2015. Her nonfiction pieces have been published by the New York Times and The Writer magazine.

Personal life 
Anica Mrose Rissi was born in Maine and grew up on the island of Deer Isle, where she graduated from the local public school system. After graduating from Yale University in 2001 with a degree in American Studies, Rissi moved to New York City, where she worked for many years as a book editor. Besides writing books, Rissi also plays fiddle in and writes lyrics for the band "Owen Lake and the Tragic Loves". She currently lives in Princeton, New Jersey.

Career 
The Anna, Banana chapter-book series, for readers ages 6–10, follows a third-grader named Anna, her wiener dog named Banana, and Anna's two best friends, Sadie and Isabel. Kirkus called the first book in the series, Anna, Banana, and the Friendship Split (Simon & Schuster, 2015), "a realistic story for sensitive kids." The series is also published in Danish and Hebrew. Rissi has stated in interviews that her own dog, Arugula, was the inspiration for the dog in the Anna, Banana books.

The Teacher's Pet (Disney-Hyperion, 2017), illustrated by Zachariah OHora, is a picture book about a teacher who is so in love with the new class pet, he can't see all the trouble it's causing. In a starred review, Publishers Weekly said, "Rissi's very funny text is a model of understatement and restraint...allowing OHora to make the most of the story's physical comedy in thickly painted scenes spiked with neon orange." School Library Journal called the book "perfect for classroom read-alouds and lessons on problem-solving or pets." The New York Times Book Review said, "Rissi (the 'Anna, Banana' books), with her edge-of-grossout humor, and OHora ('Horrible Bear!'), with his giant-headed, candy-colored people, have over-the-top sensibilities that mesh fantastically" and USA Today called it "A guaranteed chuckle for any grown-up who’s ever had to take care of the class 'pet' for the weekend."

Watch Out for Wolf! (Disney-Hyperion, 2019), illustrated by Charles Santoso, is a picture book about five little piggies who are preparing a surprise birthday party for their friend Wolf. The book was chosen for the Texas Library Association's 2020 2x2 Reading List. It is also published in Spanish and Catalan.

Love, Sophia on the Moon (Little, Brown Books for Young Readers, 2020), illustrated by Mika Song, is a picture book about a child who runs away to the moon after getting in trouble on earth. She writes letters to her mother, and her mother writes back. In a starred review, BookPage called the book a "tender, funny epistolary tale" and noted that "With clear affection, author Anica Mrose Rissi (best known for her Anna, Banana series) captures the determination and obstinacy of children and the steady, unwavering love of a parent." Kirkus Reviews said, "Readers will love it to the moon and back." The book is also published in Chinese and was awarded the 2021 Paterson Prize for Books for Young People in the Pre-K to Grade 3 category and the 2021 Maine Literary Award in Children's Literature category.

Hide and Don't Seek: And Other Very Scary Stories (HarperCollins, 2021) is a middle-grade short story collection that Kirkus Reviews called "ideal for any younger reader looking for bite-sized horror." Publishers Weekly said of the "20 brief offerings" in the collection, "some stories succeed better than others," but concluded "the sheer variety of creepy concepts, unsettling moments interspersed with humor, and gotcha twists will appeal to younger middle grade readers who are ready for a gateway into horror fiction—and a book to read around the campfire." The book includes "full-page charcoal-style illustrations" by Carolina Godina that "provide a sense of ominous eeriness." The collection is also published in Polish, Russian, and Czech.

Rissi's debut young adult novel, Always Forever Maybe (HarperCollins, 2018), is described as "about the depths and boundaries of true friendship and obsessive teenage love." Publishers Weekly said the book "meaningfully highlights known patterns of intimate-partner abuse and speaks to the joy and importance of enduring friendship". Always Forever Maybe was named to the Texas Library Association's TAYSHAS 2019 Reading List and is also published in Danish.

Rissi's second young adult novel, Nobody Knows But You (HarperCollins, 2020), "intersperses news reports, eyewitness testimony, personal letters and texts, and court transcripts to recount the eight summer weeks that led to a brutal murder at Camp Cavanick," according to Publishers Weekly. The book was named a Junior Library Guild Gold Standard Selection. Nobody Knows But You is also published in Dutch.

Bibliography

Picture books
 The Teacher's Pet, illustrated by Zachariah OHora (Disney-Hyperion, 2017)
 Watch Out for Wolf!, illustrated by Charles Santoso (Disney-Hyperion, 2019)
 Love, Sophia on the Moon, illustrated by Mika Song (Little, Brown Books for Young Readers, 2020)

Chapter books
 Anna, Banana, and the Friendship Split, illustrated by Meg Park (Simon & Schuster, 2015)
 Anna, Banana, and the Monkey in the Middle, illustrated by Meg Park (Simon & Schuster, 2015)
 Anna, Banana, and the Big-Mouth Bet, illustrated by Meg Park (Simon & Schuster, 2015)
 Anna, Banana, and the Puppy Parade, illustrated by Meg Park (Simon & Schuster, 2016)
 Anna, Banana, and the Little Lost Kitten, illustrated by Meg Park (Simon & Schuster, 2017)
 Anna, Banana, and the Recipe for Disaster, illustrated by Meg Park (Simon & Schuster, 2018)
 Anna, Banana, and the Sleepover Secret, illustrated by Cassey Kuo (Simon & Schuster, 2018)
 Anna, Banana, and the Magic Show Mix-Up, illustrated by Cassey Kuo (Simon & Schuster, 2019)

Middle grade books
 Hide and Don't Seek: And Other Very Scary Stories, illustrated by Carolina Godina (HarperCollins, 2021)

Young Adult novels
 Always Forever Maybe (HarperCollins, 2018)
 Nobody Knows But You (HarperCollins, 2020)

References 

Living people
Writers from Maine
People from Deer Isle, Maine
Yale University alumni
Year of birth missing (living people)
American women writers
People from Princeton, New Jersey
21st-century American women